The Morning Lasted All Day: A Retrospective is a compilation album released by The Dream Academy in 2014. It is the band's second compilation album, following the Japan-only release of Somewhere in the Sun... Best of the Dream Academy in 2000. While the latter album was assembled without input from the band, The Morning Lasted All Day was compiled, annotated, and remastered by lead singer Nick Laird-Clowes. Of the album's 24 tracks, 6 were previously unreleased. These include the instrumental version of "Power to Believe" selected by John Hughes for use in Planes, Trains and Automobiles and "Sunrising", the first song recorded by the band since 1990. Also included are two songs ("Living in a War" and "The Chosen Few") featuring guitar by David Gilmour, who co-produced two of the band's three studio albums.

Track listing

Disc One

Disc Two

References 

2014 compilation albums
The Dream Academy albums